Nationality words link to articles with information on the nation's poetry or literature (for instance, Irish or France).

Events
January – Elizabeth Barrett Browning is given her golden cocker spaniel "Flush" by writer Mary Russell Mitford.
July 20 – English "peasant poet" absconds from an asylum for the insane at High Beach in Essex and walks 90 miles (140 km) to his home at Northborough in the east midlands. In late December he is admitted to Northampton General Lunatic Asylum where he will spend the remaining 23 years of his life. 
 Victor Hugo is elected to the Académie Française, on his fifth attempt.

Works published in English

United Kingdom
 Sarah Fuller Adams, Vivia Perpetua: A dramatic poem
 Robert Browning, Pippa Passes, verse drama
 W. J. Fox, Hymns and Anthems, 150 numbered hymns without music, 13 by Sarah Fuller Adams, including "Nearer, my God, to thee"; anthology
 Thomas Moore, The Poetical Works of Thomas Moore, in 10 volumes, published starting in 1840 and ending this year; Irish poet published in the United Kingdom
 Samuel Laman Blanchard Life and Literary Remains of L. E. L. (Letitia Elizabeth Landon) including Castruccio Castracani (a 5-act tragedy in verse), The Female Picture Gallery (prose) and the poetry collection Subjects for Pictures

United States
 Ralph Waldo Emerson:
 "Compensation"
 "The Sphinx", first published in The Dial this year, it was later included in Emerson's Poems 1847
 William Davis Gallagher, editor, Selections from the Poetical Literature of the West, one of the earliest American regional poetry anthologies; includes poems by 38 writers in the West, including Gallagher's own very popular poem, "Miami Woods"
 Charles Follen, Works, poetry and prose, published this year and in 1842
 Henry Wadsworth Longfellow's Ballads and other Poems, including "The Wreck of the Hesperus", "The Village Blacksmith", "Elcelsior" and "The Skeleton in Armor"
 James Russell Lowell, A Year's Life
 Cornelius Mathews, Wakondah; The Master of Life, a narrative poem about prehistoric Native Americans
 Frances Sargent Osgood, The Poetry of Flowers and the Flowers of Poetry
 Adrien Rouquette, Les savanes
 Lydia Howard Sigourney:
 Pocahontas, and Other Poems, New York: Harper & Brothers
 Poems, Religious and Elegiac
 Seba Smith, Powhatan

Other in English
 Thomas Moore, The Poetical Works of Thomas Moore, in 10 volumes, published starting in 1840 and ending this year; Irish poet published in the United Kingdom
 Standish O'Grady, The Emigrant, a long narrative poem, Irish-born Canadian

Works published in other languages
 Mikhail Lermontov, The Demon: An Eastern Tale, Russia
 Frederik Paludan-Müller:
 Adam Homo, three-volume novel in verse, published starting this year to 1848, Denmark
 Venus
 Betty Paoli, Gedichte ("Poems"), Austria
 Alexander Pushkin, The Bronze Horseman, Russia
 Henrik Wergeland, Svalen ("The Swallow"), Norway
 José Zorrilla, Cantos del trovador, Spain

Births
Death years link to the corresponding "[year] in poetry" article:
 March 10 – Ina Donna Coolbrith (died 1928), American
 March 21 – Mathilde Blind ("Claude Lake"), born Mathilde Cohen (died 1896 in poetry), German-born English
 March 31 – Iosif Vulcan (died 1907), Romanian magazine editor, poet, playwright, novelist and cultural figure
 April 6 – Ivan Surikov (died 1898), Russian
 April 29 – Edward Rowland Sill (died 1887), American
 May 22 – Catulle Mendès (died 1909), French
 August 18 – Robert Williams Buchanan (died 1901), Scottish
 December 30 – Charles E. Carryl (died 1920), American

Deaths
Birth years link to the corresponding "[year] in poetry" article:
 February 19 – Ulrika Widström (born 1764), Swedish poet and translator
 March 2 – George Dyer (born 1755), English classicist and writer
 May 20 – Joseph Blanco White (born 1775), Spanish-born English theologian and poet
 June 1 – Robert Allan (born 1774), Scottish weaver poet, in New York
 July 27 – Mikhail Lermontov (born 1814), Russian poet, dramatist, fiction writer and painter, in duel
 August 24 – Bjarni Thorarensen (born 1786), Icelandic poet and official
 September 16 – Thomas John Dibdin (born 1771), English playwright and songwriter

See also

 19th century in poetry
 19th century in literature
 List of years in poetry
 List of years in literature
 Victorian literature
 French literature of the 19th century
 Biedermeier era of German literature
 Golden Age of Russian Poetry (1800–1850)
 Young Germany (Junges Deutschland) a loose group of German writers from about 1830 to 1850
 List of poets
 Poetry
 List of poetry awards

Notes

19th-century poetry

Poetry